Plestia is a genus of planthoppers in the subfamily Ricaniinae, erected by Carl Stål in 1870.

Species

References

External links
 

Ricaniidae